Dvorska Vas is a settlement in the Municipality of Radovljica in the Upper Carniola region of Slovenia.

References

External links 

Dvorska Vas at Geopedia

Populated places in the Municipality of Radovljica